L'Albatros (French for The Albatross) is a poem by decadent French poet Charles Baudelaire.

The poem, inspired by an incident on Baudelaire's trip to Bourbon Island in 1841, was begun in 1842 but not completed until 1859 with the addition of the final verse.

Italian writer, literary critic, and university professor  gave the poem a full treatment in his 1994 book L'albatros di Baudelaire.

Text 
The poem is located in the section "Spleen et Idéal". It is built with four alexandrins quatrains with crossed Rhymes (ABAB type), alternating feminine and masculine word endings.

References

Further reading 
 

1859 poems
Poetry by Charles Baudelaire
19th-century French poets
Decadent literature
Poètes maudits